The Guystac Trophy was a Guyanese inter-county cricket tournament, the final of which had first-class status.  The tournament was played annually, the final being usually between Demerara and Berbice, two former colonies and now counties of Guyana. The only exception came in 1980/81 when a side from Essequibo qualified for the final instead of Demerara. The matches were played over a maximum of 4 days but rain caused many games over the years to be drawn.

History 

Originally named the Jones Cup, the matches were first played in 1954/55 but the final didn't get first-class status until 1971/72. In 1973/74 they played for the Guyana President's Trophy instead of the Jones Cup and in 1984/85 they competed for the Guystac Trophy for the first time. The competition remained the Guystac Trophy until the final fixture in 1989/90 when the two sides competed for the Kenneth Sookram Memorial Trophy. The tournament has continued since 1989/90 under a number of names but the final no longer has first-class status.

Honour board

External links
Cricket Archive

Guystac
First-class cricket competitions